My Indo Airlines is a cargo airline based in Soekarno–Hatta International Airport. It is a scheduled and charter cargo airlines which focuses on the domestic and international cargo sector. 

Established in 2014, the airline's inaugural route connecting Jakarta, Indonesia and Singapore. Due to the safety issues of Indonesia's aviation industry, My Indo Airlines is one of 59 airlines banned from operating in European airspace.

During Covid-19 Pandemic, the airline operate some flights to Bangkok - Bangkok–Suvarnabhumi.

Destinations
  India
India - Chennai International Airport
  Sri Lanka
Sri Lanka - Bandaranaike International Airport
 Indonesia
Balikpapan - Sultan Aji Muhammad Sulaiman Airport
Jakarta - Soekarno Hatta International Airport Hub
Semarang - Ahmad Yani International Airport
Jayapura - Sentani Airport
Wamena - Wamena Airport
  Philippines
Manila - Ninoy Aquino International Airport
   Singapore
Singapore - Singapore Changi Airport
  Thailand
Bangkok - Suvarnabhumi Airport
  China
China - Shenzhen Bao'an International Airport
China - Haikou Meilan International Airport

Fleet
As of June 2022, the My Indo Airlines fleet consists of the following aircraft

References

External links
Official website

Airlines of Indonesia
Cargo airlines of Indonesia
Airlines established in 2014
Companies based in Jakarta
Indonesian companies established in 2014